Sorkheh Dizaj (also Romanized as Sorkheh Dīzaj; also known as Sirkhazach) is a village in Ozomdel-e Jonubi Rural District, in the Central District of Varzaqan County, East Azerbaijan Province, Iran. At the 2006 census, its population was 496, in 101 families.

References 

Towns and villages in Varzaqan County